Centrosomal protein 85 is a protein that in humans is encoded by the CEP85 gene.

Function

This gene encodes a protein that belongs to the centrosome-associated family of proteins. The centrosome is a subcellular organelle in the animal cell that functions as a microtubule organizing center and is involved in cell-cycle progression. Alternate splicing results in multiple transcript variants. [provided by RefSeq, Jul 2013].

References

Further reading 

Centrosome